Mary is a 1920 musical comedy with book and lyrics by Frank Mandel and Otto Harbach and music by Louis Hirsch. Among its songs was "Love Nest", Hirsch's most successful, later the theme song for the Burns and Allen radio show.

Story
A young man invents a portable house, expecting to make his fortune, but fails in the attempt. He strikes oil accidentally, thereby becoming wealthy, so is able to marry his sweetheart, the "Mary" of the title.

Productions
Its first Australian production, starring W. S. Percy and Ethel Morrison, was staged at the Theatre Royal, Adelaide by J. C. Williamson's "Night Out" company on 23 September 1922.

References 

1920 musicals
Australian musicals